Hydra Athletic Club, known as Hydra AC or HAC for short, is an Algerian football club based in the Hydra neighbourhood of Algiers. The club was founded in 1936 and its colours are red and white. Their home stadium, Stade de Hydra, has a capacity of 4,000 spectators. The club is currently playing in the Inter-Régions Division.

History
The club was founded in 1936 as Groupement Sportif d'Alger Hydra. In 1962, after the independence of Algeria, the name of the club was changed to Hydra AC by Ali Benfadah, a player at the club at the time, in reference to his former club, French club Le Havre AC which is known as Le HAC or just HAC for short.

Notable players

References

Football clubs in Algeria
Association football clubs established in 1936
Football clubs in Algiers
1936 establishments in Algeria
Sports clubs in Algeria